Jorge Adrián García Echeverría (born 19 August 1986) is a former Uruguayan footballer.

Honours
Uruguayan Primera División (2): 2004, 2006–07

Personal life
García killed his father in 2014.

References

External links
 Profile at Soccerway

 Stats at Footballdatabase

1986 births
Living people
Footballers from Montevideo
Uruguayan footballers
Uruguayan murderers
Uruguay international footballers
Association football midfielders
Danubio F.C. players
Sportivo Cerrito players
C.A. Cerro players
Expatriate footballers in Brazil
Patricides